Anthony "Fat Tony" Rabito (born January 27, 1934) was an alleged Consigliere of the Bonanno crime family.  It has also been said he was a captain.

Legal issues
He was one of the people convicted for racketeering due to the Joseph D. Pistone FBI investigation.

Rabito had been incarcerated in ”Loretto Prison for gamnling. When he was released, His probation officer named him from frequenting alleged mob hangouts Bamonte's,  Park Side Restaurant, Don Peppe and Rao's.

References

External links
What’s Left of the Mob

American gangsters of Italian descent
Bonanno crime family
1934 births
Living people